Rodney Noel Exton (28 December 1927 – 22 December 1999) was an English first-class cricketer. A right-handed batsman who bowled right-arm off break, he was educated at Clifton College in Bristol, where he was considered a talented cricketer.

Exton made his first-class debut for Hampshire in the 1946 County Championship, the first Championship after the Second World War. His first match came against Leicestershire. He made four first-class appearance for Hampshire in 1946, his final match coming against Surrey. During 1946 he contracted poliomyelitis, which ended his first-class career.

Exton embarked on a teaching career after studying at Lincoln College, Oxford, between 1948 and 1951. He taught at Eton College and Mill Hill before becoming Headmaster at Reed's School in Cobham, Surrey. He died in Westminster, London on 22 December 1999.

References

External links
Rodney Exton at Cricinfo
Rodney Exton at CricketArchive

1927 births
1999 deaths
Sportspeople from Bournemouth
Cricketers from Dorset
English cricketers
Hampshire cricketers
People educated at Clifton College
Heads of schools in England
Schoolteachers from Surrey
Teachers at Eton College